We are Electrocution is the debut album by nihilistic new wave punk rock band Le Shok released in 2000 on GSL. Initially available only in limited quantities on vinyl, a CD was released the following year. The album garnered inclusion on the Village Voice critics Pazz & Jop list for 2000.

Track listing
"I Know You're Ready" – :57
"Killed by Fuck" – 1:19
"Where's the Line Begin for Vicodin?" – :49
"Blend the Quick with the Slow" – 1:17
"White Tie, You Die" – :34
"Give Me Something Help Me Please" – :43
"TV in My Eye" – 1:57
"Brett Cutts (Himself)" – :41
"We Are Electrocution" – :53
"Fade in, Fade Out" – 1:31
"They Call Her Action" – 1:11
"Mind Your Own Business" – 1:26
"Do the Dramatic" – 1:19

References

Le Shok albums
2000 albums
Gold Standard Laboratories albums